The Kremlin accords were a series of agreements signed by President Bill Clinton of the United States and President Boris Yeltsin of Russia on January 14, 1994. These treaties stopped the preprogrammed targeting of nuclear weapons at targets on any nation (see United States – Russia mutual detargeting) and provided for the dismantling of the Russian nuclear arsenal positioned in Ukraine.

References

1994 in Russia
1994 in the United States
Russia–United States relations
Treaties of the United States
Nuclear weapons policy
Treaties concluded in 1994
Treaties of Russia
Presidency of Bill Clinton
Boris Yeltsin